Priyuraalu is a 2021 Indian Telugu-language romantic drama film directed by G. V. Rama Raju and starring Prudhvi Medavaram and Mounika. The film streamed on SonyLIV on 17 September 2021.

Cast 
Prudhvi Medavaram as Madhav
Mounika as Divya
Kaushik Reddy as Watchman
Dr. Sai Kamakshi Bhaskarla as Sarita

Production 
The film was mostly shot from January to February of 2020 but was delayed because of the COVID-19 pandemic.

Reception 
A critic from 123telugu wrote that "Barring the climax and a few realistic scenes, this film has no proper emotions and ends as a dull watch". A critic from OTT play wrote that "The film presents a realistic take on extramarital relationships and explores the thin line between love and desire". A critic from Pinkvilla wrote that "'Priyuraalu' would have been a different, more weighty drama had the conflict plot point been introduced early on in the second half".

References

Indian romantic drama films
2020s Telugu-language films